Pacific Air was an American indie pop band formed in 2012. The band consisted of brothers, Ryan and Taylor Lawhon. The band was previously known as "KO KO".

History
The Lawhon brothers formed KO KO in 2012. They released three songs on Bandcamp and, a week later, received a record deal from Republic Records. Due to the number of other groups using the "KO KO" moniker, the group changed its name to Pacific Air and began work on their first EP.

In October 2012, the group released the Long Live KOKO EP. The record received critical acclaim, as did the EP's lead single, "Float". "Float" saw a rise in popularity following a flurry of Hype Machine success and a number of remixes including Ra Ra Riot, RAC, TheFatRat, Robert Delong and Sound Remedy. Shortly after the release of the EP, Pacific Air embarked on several tours, opening for bands such as Passion Pit, Walk the Moon, Two Door Cinema Club, Ra Ra Riot, and Atlas Genius. During this time, they have also been promoting their debut studio album, Stop Talking, which released on June 11, 2013.

The band reached "its end, for now" in September 2014 when Ryan Lawhon announced his new solo project, Mating Ritual.

Members
Current members
 Ryan Lawhon– lead vocals, guitar (2012–present)
 Taylor Lawhon – vocals, keyboards, tambourine, sleigh bells, flute (2012–present)

Touring members
 Steven Lindenfelser - guitar (2012–present)
 Alex Lopez – bass (2012–present)
 Dan Bailey - drums (2012-2013)

Discography
 Long Live KOKO EP (2012)
 Stop Talking (2013)

References

External links
 

Alternative dance musical groups
American musical duos
American synth-pop groups
Electronic music groups from California
Indie pop groups from Los Angeles
Indie rock musical groups from California
Musical groups established in 2012
Republic Records artists
2012 establishments in California